John Joseph "Taps" Gallagher (July 16, 1904 – February 7, 1982) was an American football and basketball player and coach. He served as the head football coach at Niagara University in 1936. However, his greatest contributions were made as the head basketball coach at Niagara from 1931 to 1943 and again from 1946 to 1965, compiling a record of 486–262.

Gallagher died on February 7, 1982, in Niagara Falls, New York.

Head coaching record

Football

References

External links
 Buffalo Hall of Fame profile

1904 births
1982 deaths
American men's basketball players
Basketball coaches from New York (state)
Basketball players from New York City
Niagara Purple Eagles athletic directors
Niagara Purple Eagles football coaches
Niagara Purple Eagles men's basketball coaches
St. John's Red Storm football players
St. John's Red Storm men's basketball players
Sportspeople from Brooklyn
Players of American football from New York City